Navas de Estena is a municipality in Ciudad Real, Castile-La Mancha, Spain. It has a population of 404.

Navas de Estena, a small village with a population of 400 people in the heart of the Toledo mountains, less than two hours from Madrid and an hour from Toledo.

Almost the whole of the Navas de Estena district is located in the Cabañeros National Park. The Boquerón of the River Estena (800 metres from the house), within the National Park, we find the most peculiar flora in Cabañeros.. The almost space-like appearance of this gorge creates the ideal conditions for yew trees, alder trees, holly trees, Royal ferns (Osmunda regalis), small peat areas... On the whole, this is a very fresh and rugged landscape, and without a doubt, the best part of Cabañeros

In the Town Hall website www.navasdeestena.org, the Tourist Association Montes de Toledo and the Cultural Association of the Mountains of Toledo www.montesdetoledo.org there are numerous hiking routes scattered around the area and also by car to visit the nearby villages and the whole of the National Park. Some of the sights include the Ermita Lookout and the recreational areas of El Acebo and the Los Reales Dam, 75 km. from Toledo.

References

Municipalities in the Province of Ciudad Real